The 57th General Assembly of Prince Edward Island was in session from June 9, 1986, to May 2, 1989. The Liberal Party led by Joe Ghiz formed the government.

Edward Clark was elected speaker.

There were four sessions of the 57th General Assembly:

Members

Kings

Prince

Queens

Notes:

References
 Election results for the Prince Edward Island Legislative Assembly, 1986-04-21
 O'Handley, Kathryn Canadian Parliamentary Guide, 1994 

Terms of the General Assembly of Prince Edward Island
1986 establishments in Prince Edward Island
1989 disestablishments in Prince Edward Island